The men's 400 metres hurdles at the 2015 World Championships in Athletics was held at the Beijing National Stadium on 22, 23 and 25 August.

Summary
While Kenya has dominated the longest hurdle race, the 3000 metres steeplechase since the 1968 Olympics, and John Akii-Bua from neighboring Uganda hinted at what might be the capability of East African athletes in this event, Kenya has never had a medalist at 400 hurdles, until this year.  Nicholas Bett was the fastest qualifier in the heats.  His teammate Boniface Tumuti was the second fastest in the semi-finals, while Bett struggled into the slowest qualifier into the finals.  That put Bett almost unnoticed in the far outside lane.  Michael Tinsley was the only returning medalist from recent history and the rest of the world leaders were already eliminated,  making for a very open race.  The fastest 5 finalists all ran their personal best just to make the final race.

Tinsley was the early leader out of the blocks, but was quickly overtaken by Denis Kudryavtsev down the backstretch.  Through the turn Tinsley began to hit hurdles, Kudryavtsev the clear leader coming to the straightaway.  A couple of meters behind was a wall of Tinsley, Jeffery Gibson and Kerron Clement, with Bett slightly behind them.  Kudryavtsev stretched for the ninth hurdle, Tinsley hit it and Bett stormed past.  Reminiscent of Kenyan steeplechase finishes, he took the final barrier somewhat awkwardly but continued with so much power that the rest of the field was left behind him.  Kudryavtsev held on for silver with a Russian national record.  Gibson won the race to the line for bronze, setting his second Bahamian national record of the competition.  The once dominant American team, shut out, while Kenya wins its first medal in the event and it was gold.

Records
Prior to the competition, the records were as follows:

Qualification standards

Schedule

Results

Heats
Qualification: Best 4 (Q) and next 4 fastest (q) qualify for the next round.

Semifinals
Qualification: First 2 in each heat (Q) and the next 2 fastest (q) advanced to the final.

Final
The final was started at 21:15.

References

400 metres hurdles
400 metres hurdles at the World Athletics Championships